CNSO may refer to:

 China National Symphony Orchestra 
 Czech National Symphony Orchestra
 Consco, a defunct software company (NASDAQ ticker symbol: CNSO)